Malika Kishino (jap. 岸野 末利加, Kishino Marika; born July 16, 1971) is a Japanese composer based in Cologne / Germany.

Biography 
Malika Kishino was born in Kyoto 1971. She studied law in Doshisha University then came to France in 1995 to study composition.
She studied at École Normale de Musique Paris with Yoshihisa Taira, at Conservatoire national supérieur de musique et de danse de Lyon with Robert Pascal and 
at the Institute for Research and Coordination Acoustic (IRCAM) with Philippe Leroux.
She moved to Cologne in 2006.
Her works are published by Edizioni Suvini Zerboni in Milan.

Works

Vocal music
Music for Choir
Satsuki (May) (2000) for mixed choir, two trumpets, trombone and two percussionists
Lo mes d’abrièu s’es en anat (April has gone…) (2005) for 12 female voices, children's choir and electronic sounds
Ichimai-Kishohmon (2011) for mixed choir, voices of Buddhist priests, sho, hichiriki, 20 stringed koto, percussion, string trio 
Prayer / Inori  (2011) for mixed choir
Dialogue Invisible  (2012) for 9 female voices 
Chant (2015) for orchestra and choir

Music with Voice
Battement (Schlag) (2003) for bariton and piano
Hila – Hila to… (2009) for countertenor and 7 players
Miraiken kara (from future sphere) (2012) for Noh-voice and alto flute

Choir and Orchestra 
Chant (2015) for orchestra and choir

Orchestral 
Du Firmament (2001–02) for orchestra
Fluxus ac Refluxus (2008) for large orchestra, divided into 7 groups
Zur Tiefe (2013) for large orchestra

Concerto 
Himmelwärts II / Vers Le Ciel II (2007) for flute, percussions and 16 strings
Rayons Crépusculaires (2007–08) for bass drum, large ensemble divided in 3 groups and 8 channel-Live–Electronic
Concerto pour Koto  (2013) for koto and orchestra
Heliodor "Hymne für ein nicht existierendes Land" (2015) for trombone and large ensemble

Ensembles 
Danse du Zephyr (2002–03) for 17 players
Sensitive Chaos  (2010) for 7 players
Stratus – Altocumulus – Cirrus (2014) for 9 players divided into 3 groups

Chamber 
Epure (1998–99) for string quartet
Astral (2001) for flute, guitar, piano, violin and violoncello
Scintillation (2002) for piano and cembalo
Epanouissement II (2004) for bass flute 
Seventeen Steps (2006) for alto flute, violin, bass koto and piano
Himmelwärts / Vers le ciel (2006) for flute, percussions, violine, viola and violoncello
Himmelsleiter (2006) for alto-flute, bass clarinet, trumpet, piano, violine and violoncello
Himmelsleiter II (2006; 2013 rev.) for alto flute, bass clarinet, trumpet, harp, violin and violoncello
Halo (2007) for two bass clarinets
Erwachen (2007) for octo bass recorder, bass koto and percussion
Erwachen II (2008) for bass flute, bass koto and percussion
Vague de Passion (2010) for marimbaphone and vibraphone
Monochromer Garten (2011) for accordion and violoncello
Monochromer Garten II (2011) for bass clarinet, baritone saxophone and trombone 
Lamento  (2013) – based on a folk song from Fukushima – for two violins 
Lamento II (2013; 2014 rev.) – based on a folk song from Fukushima – for violin and viola
Monochromer Garten VII (2015) for recorder and percussion

Solo 
Danse automnale de feuilles vermeilles (1997) for piano
Epanouissement (2003) for violoncello
Koi Hanété… (2006) for piano. Based a Haiku of Shiki Masaoka.
Monochromer Garten III (2011) for timpani
Monochromer Garten IV (2012) for 30 stringed koto
Monochromer Garten V (2013 for koto
Monochromer Garten VI (2015) for viola

Series „Monochromer Garten“ 
Monochromer Garten (2011) for accordion and violoncello
Monochromer Garten II (2011) for bass clarinet, baritone saxophone and trombone 
Monochromer Garten III (2011) for timpani
Monochromer Garten IV (2012) for 30 stringed koto
Monochromer Garten V (2013 for koto 
Monochromer Garten VI (2015) for viola 
Monochromer Garten VII (2015) for recorder and percussion

Instrumental music with Electronic 
Irisation Aquatique (2002) for bass clarinet, piano, violoncello and electronic sounds
Eclosion (2005) for harp and 9 channel-live-electronic
Lo mes d’abriéu s’es en anat (April has gone) (2005) for 12 female voices, children's choir and electronic sound
Lebensfunke (2007) révision 2010 for bass-drum and electronics
Rayons Crépusculaires (2007–08) for bass-drum, large ensemble divided in 3 groups and 8 channel-Live–Electronic
Aqua vitae (2008) for two pianos, two (water-)percussions and 8 channel-live-electronic
Qualia (2009) for bass koto and 10 channel-live-electronic
 Lebensfunke II (2010) for bass drum and 8 channel-live-electronic

References

External links

 Website of Composer
 Publisher Edizioni Suvini-Zerboni
 Website of Tokyo Concerts
 Worldcat

1971 births
20th-century classical composers
20th-century Japanese composers
20th-century women composers
21st-century classical composers
21st-century Japanese composers
21st-century women composers
Japanese classical composers
Japanese women classical composers
Japanese women in electronic music
Living people
Musicians from Kyoto
Women in classical music
21st-century Japanese women musicians